Vatican City uses Italian in its official documents and as its main working language. However, many other languages are also used by institutions situated within the state, such as the Holy See and the Swiss Guard, as well as personally by its diverse population.

History
During the Roman Empire, Latin was the language spoken in the area corresponding to the present Vatican City. The subsequent Papal States also used Latin for official purposes during the first centuries of their existence, while Italian was commonly spoken. In 1870 the area became part of the Kingdom of Italy, whose official language was Italian.

In 1929 the Lateran Treaty established Vatican City as an independent state.

Since the state came into existence in 1929, most of the buildings situated within it predated it by centuries. Inscriptions can be found in them mainly in Latin, but also in Italian, Greek, French and German.

Present languages
Many languages are spoken within the state, as its inhabitants come from many countries. Italian is the lingua franca of the Vatican and replaced Latin as the official language of the Synod of Bishops in 2014. The Holy See, the entity with authority over the state (yet legally distinct), uses Latin as its official language and Italian as its main working language in administrative and diplomatic affairs. French is also sometimes used as a diplomatic language. In the Swiss Guard, Swiss German is the language used for giving commands, but the individual guards take their oath of loyalty in their own languages: German, French, Italian or Romansh.

Since the state was established, native languages of the popes have been Italian, German, Polish and Spanish

Websites
The official website of Vatican City is primarily in Italian, with a partial version in English. Previous versions of the website were also available in French, German and Spanish.

The official website of the Holy See is primarily in Italian, with versions in English, French, German, Portuguese and Spanish, and partial versions in Arabic, Chinese and Latin. Some content is also available in many other languages, such as Albanian, Belarusian, Croatian, Czech, Dutch, Hebrew, Hungarian, Indonesian, Japanese, Korean, Lithuanian, Maltese, Polish, Russian, Slovak, Slovene, Swahili and Ukrainian.

The Holy See's newspaper L'Osservatore Romano is published in Italian, English, French, German, Polish, Portuguese and Spanish. The Vatican News website is available in many languages: Albanian, Amharic, Arabic, Armenian, Belarusian, Bulgarian, Chinese, Croatian, Czech, English, French, German, Italian, Japanese, Korean, Latvian, Lithuanian, Hindi, Hungarian, Malayalam, Macedonian, Polish, Portuguese, Romanian, Russian, Slovak, Slovene, Spanish, Swahili, Swedish, Tamil, Tigrinya, Ukrainian and Vietnamese.

See also

Index of Vatican City-related articles
Ecclesiastical Latin, the form of Latin used by the Church in its documents.
Romanesco, the vernacular spoken in Rome around the Vatican City.

References

 
Languages of Europe
Culture in Rome